This article lists national heads of government and heads of state who held an active military rank while in office.

Note that in many countries, the head of state office has an ex officio military rank; for example, the President of the United States is commander-in-chief of the armed forces. This list omits ex officio ranks.

Africa
Algeria
Houari Boumediene (colonel) (in office 1965–1976)
Khaled Nezzar (major general) (in office 1992–1994)
Benin
Christophe Soglo (colonel) (in office 1963–1964, 1965–1967)
Alphonse Alley (lieutenant colonel) (in office 1967–1968)
Maurice Kouandété (lieutenant colonel) (in office 1967–1968)
Paul-Émile de Souza (colonel) (in office 1969–1970)
Mathieu Kérékou (major→general) (in office 1972–1991)
Burkina Faso
Sangoulé Lamizana (major general) (in office 1966–1980)
Saye Zerbo (colonel) (in office 1980–1982)
Jean-Baptiste Ouédraogo (major) (in office 1982–1983)
Thomas Sankara (captain) (in office 1983–1987)
Blaise Compaoré (captain) (in office 1987–2014)
Gilbert Diendéré (brigadier general) (in office 2015)
Burundi
Michel Micombero (colonel→lieutenant general) (in office 1966–1976)
Jean-Baptiste Bagaza (colonel) (in office 1976–1987)
Pierre Buyoya (major) (in office 1987–1993)
Central African Republic
Jean-Bédel Bokassa (colonel→marshal) (in office 1966–1979)
André Kolingba (major general→general) (in office 1981–1993)
François Bozizé (general) (in office 2003–2005)
Chad
Félix Malloum (brigadier general) (in office 1975–1979)
Comoros
Combo Ayouba (colonel) (in office 1995)
Azali Assoumani (colonel) (in office 1999–2002)
Republic of the Congo
Marien Ngouabi (major) (in office 1969–1977)
Joachim Yhombi-Opango (brigadier general) (in office 1977–1979)
Denis Sassou-Nguesso (colonel→general) (in office 1979–1992)
Egypt
Mostafa Fahmy Pasha (lieutenant general) (in office 1891–1893)
Muhammad Naguib (major general) (in office 1953–1954)
Gamal Abdel Nasser (colonel) (in office 1954–1970)
Anwar El Sadat (colonel) (in office 1970–1981)
Hosni Mubarak (air chief marshal) (in office 1981–2011)
Mohamed Hussein Tantawi (field marshal) (in office 2011–2012)
Equatorial Guinea
Teodoro Obiang Nguema Mbasogo (brigadier general) (in office 1979–present)
Ethiopia
Aman Andom (lieutenant general) (in office 1974)
Tafari Benti (brigadier general) (in office 1974–1977)
Mengistu Haile Mariam (lieutenant colonel) (in office 1977–1991)
The Gambia
Yahya Jammeh (colonel) (in office 1994–1996)
Ghana
Joseph Arthur Ankrah (lieutenant general) (in office 1966–1969)
Akwasi Afrifa (brigadier) (in office 1969–1970)
Ignatius Kutu Acheampong (colonel→general) (in office 1972–1978)
Fred Akuffo (lieutenant general) (in office 1978–1979)
Jerry Rawlings (flight lieutenant) (in office June–September 1979, 1981–1992)
Guinea
Lansana Conté (colonel→general) (in office 1984–1991)
Moussa Dadis Camara (captain) (in office 2008–2009)
Sékouba Konaté (brigadier general) (in office 2009–2010)
Guinea Bissau
João Bernardo Vieira (general) (in office 1980–1994)
Ansumane Mané (brigadier general) ((in office May 1999)
Veríssimo Correia Seabra (general) (in office 2003–2004)
Mamadu Ture Kuruma (major general) (in office April–May 2012)
Ivory Coast
Robert Guéï (brigadier general) (in office 1999–2000)
Lesotho
Justin Lekhanya (major general) (in office 1986–1991)
Elias Phisoana Ramaema (major general) (in office 1991–1993)
Liberia
Samuel Doe (master sergeant→field marshal) (in office 1980–1990)
Libya
Muammar al-Gaddafi (lieutenant→colonel) (in office 1969–1979, de facto leader 1979–2011)
Madagascar
Gabriel Ramanantsoa (major general) (in office 1972–1975)
Gilles Andriamahazo (major general) (in office February–June 1975)
Didier Ratsiraka (rear admiral→vice admiral) (in office 1975–1993)
Charles Rabemananjara (general) (in office 2007–2009)
Albert Camille Vital (brigadier general) (in office 2009–2011)
Mali
Moussa Traoré (lieutenant→general) (in office 1968–1991)
Amadou Toumani Touré (lieutenant colonel→brigadier general) (in office 1991–1992)
Amadou Sanogo (captain→general) (in office 2012–2013)
Mauritania
Mustafa Ould Salek (colonel) (in office 1978–1979)
Mohamed Mahmoud Ould Louly (lieutenant colonel) (in office 1979–1980)
Mohamed Khouna Ould Haidalla (colonel) (in office 1979–1984)
Maaouya Ould Sid'Ahmed Taya (colonel) (in office 1981–1992)
Ely Ould Mohamed Vall (colonel) (in office 2005–2007)
Mohamed Ould Abdel Aziz (brigadier general) (in office 2008–2009)
Niger
Seyni Kountché (lieutenant colonel→major general) (in office 1974–1987)
Ali Saibou (brigadier general) (in office 1987–1993)
Ibrahim Baré Maïnassara (colonel) (in office 1996)
Daouda Malam Wanké (major) (in office April–December 1999)
Salou Djibo (colonel→lieutenant general) (in office 2010–2011)
Nigeria
Nnamdi Azikiwe (in office 1963–1966)
Johnson Aguiyi-Ironsi (major general) (in office January–July 1966)
Yakubu Gowon (lieutenant colonel→general) (in office 1966–1975)
Murtala Mohammed (brigadier→general) (in office 1975–1976)
Olusegun Obasanjo (lieutenant general→general) (in office 1976–1979)
Muhammadu Buhari (major general) (in office 1983–1985)
Ibrahim Babangida (major general→general) (in office 1985–1993)
Sani Abacha (general) (in office 1993–1998)
Abdulsalami Abubakar (general) (in office 1998–1999)
Rwanda
Juvénal Habyarimana (major general) (in office 1973–1992)
Paul Kagame (major→major general) (de facto 1994–2003)
São Tomé and Príncipe
Manuel Quintas de Almeida (lieutenant) (in office August 1995)
Fernando Pereira (major) (in office July 2003)
Sierra Leone
Andrew Juxon-Smith (brigadier) (in office 1967–1968)
John Amadu Bangura (brigadier) (in office 1968)
Valentine Strasser (captain) (in office 1992–1996) Solomon Musa (lieutenant) (in office 1992–1993) Julius Maada Bio (brigadier) (in office 1993–1995, January–March 1996)
Johnny Paul Koroma (major) (in office 1997–1998)
Somalia
Siad Barre (major general) (in office 1969–1991)
Mohammad Ali Samatar (major general→lieutenant general) (in office 1987–1990)

Sudan
Ibrahim Abboud (general) (in office 1958–1964)
Gaafar Nimeiry (colonel→major general) (in office 1969–1985)
Abdel Rahman Swar al-Dahab (general→field marshal) (in office 1985–1986)
Omar al-Bashir (brigadier→field marshal) (in office 1989–2019)
Togo
Kléber Dadjo (colonel) (in office January–April 1967)
Gnassingbé Eyadéma (colonel→general) (in office 1967–2005)
Uganda
Idi Amin (major general→field marshal) (in office 1971–1979)
Bazilio Olara-Okello (brigadier) (in office 1985)
Tito Okello (lieutenant general→general) (in office 1985–1986)
Yoweri Museveni (lieutenant general→general) (in office 1986–2004)
Zaire
Mobutu Sese Seko (lieutenant general→field marshal) (in office 1965–1997)

Americas

Caribbean
Cuba
Fulgencio Batista (sergeant→colonel) (in office 1933–1940)
Fidel Castro (commandante) (in office 1959–2008)
Dominican Republic
Pedro Santana (general→captain general) (in office 1844–1848, 1853–1856, 1858–1862)
Manuel Jimenes (general) (in office 1848–1849)
Buenaventura Báez (general) (in office 1849–1853, 1856–1858, 1865–1866, 1868–1874)
Manuel de Regla Mota (division general) (in office May–October 1856)
José Desiderio Valverde (general) (in office 1857–1858)
Felipe Ribero y Lemoyne (captain general) (in office 1862–1863)
Carlos de Vargas Machuca y Cerveto (captain general) (in office 1863–1864)
José de la Gándara y Navarro (captain general) (in office 1864–1865)
José María Cabral (general) (in office August–November 1865, 1866–1868)

Rafael Trujillo (brigadier general→generalissimo) (in office 1930–1961)
Haiti
Toussaint Louverture (general) (in office 1801–1802).
Alexandre Pétion (general) (in office 1807–1818)
Charles Rivière-Hérard (divisional general) (in office 1843–1844)
Philippe Guerrier (in office 1844–1845)
Jean-Louis Pierrot (general) (in office 1845–1846)
Jean-Baptiste Riché (general) (in office 1846–1847)
Faustin Soulouque (general) (in office 1847–1849)
Fabre Geffrard (general) (in office 1859–1867)
Sylvain Salnave (general) (in office 1867–1869)
Nissage Saget (general) (in office 1869–1874)
Michel Domingue (general) (in office 1874–1876)
François Denys Légitime (general) (in office 1889–1889)
Florvil Hyppolite (general) (in office 1889–1896)
Tirésias Simon Sam (general) (in office 1896–1902)
Pierre Nord Alexis (general) (in office 1902–1908)
François C. Antoine Simon (divisional general) (in office 1908–1911)
Tancrède Auguste (general) (in office 1912–1913)
Oreste Zamor (general) (in office February–October 1914)
Joseph Davilmar Théodore (in office 1914–1915)
Vilbrun Guillaume Sam (in office February–July 1915)
Franck Lavaud (ฺbrigadier general) (in office May–December 1950)
Paul Magloire (major general) (in office 1950–1956)
Antonio Thrasybule Kébreau (brigadier general) (in office June–December 1957)
Henri Namphy (lieutenant general) (in office 1986–1988)
Prosper Avril (lieutenant general) (in office 1988–1990)
Raoul Cédras (lieutenant general) (in office 1991–1994)

Central America
Costa Rica
Federico Tinoco Granados (general) (in office 1917–1919)
El Salvador
Gerardo Barrios (captain general) (in office 1859–1860, 1861–1863)
Santiago González Portillo (marshal) (in office 1871–1872, 1872–1876)
Fernando Figueroa (general) (in office 1885, 1907–1911)
Francisco Menéndez (general) (in office 1885–1890)
Carlos Ezeta (general) (in office 1890–1894)
Rafael Antonio Gutiérrez (general) (in office 1894–1898)
Tomás Regalado Romero (general) (in office 1898–1903)
Pedro José Escalón (general) (in office 1903–1907)
Maximiliano Hernández Martínez (general) (in office 1931–1934, 1935–1944)
Andrés Ignacio Menéndez (general) (in office 1934–1935, 1944)
Osmín Aguirre y Salinas (colonel) (in office 1944–1945)
Óscar Osorio (lieutenant colonel) (in office 1948–1956)
José María Lemus (lieutenant colonel) (in office 1956–1960)
Julio Adalberto Rivera Carballo (colonel) (in office 1962–1967)
Fidel Sánchez Hernández (general) (in office 1967–1972)
Arturo Armando Molina (colonel) (in office 1972–1977)
Carlos Humberto Romero (general) (in office 1977–1979)
Guatemala
Jacobo Árbenz Guzmán (colonel) (in office 1951–1954)
Carlos Castillo Armas (colonel) (in office 1954–1957)
Guillermo Flores Avendaño (colonel) (in office 1957–1958)
Enrique Peralta Azurdia (colonel) (in office 1963–1966)
Carlos Manuel Arana Osorio (colonel) (in office 1970–1974)
Kjell Eugenio Laugerud García (brigadier general) (in office 1974–1982)
Fernando Romeo Lucas García (brigadier general) (in office 1978–1982)
Efraín Ríos Montt (brigadier general) (in office 1982–1983)
Óscar Humberto Mejía Víctores (brigadier general) (in office 1983–1986)
Honduras
Manuel Bonilla (general) (in office 1903–1907, 1912–1913)
Tiburcio Carías Andino (general) (in office 1933–1949)
Oswaldo López Arellano (general) (in office 1963–1971, 1972–1975)
Juan Alberto Melgar Castro (general) (in office 1975–1978)
Policarpo Paz García (brigadier general) (in office 1978–1982)
Nicaragua
Anastasio Somoza Garcia (major general) (in office 1936–1956)
Anastasio Somoza Debayle (major general) (in office 1967–1979)
Panama
Omar Torrijos (brigadier general) (in office 1968–1981)
Florencio Flores Aguilar (colonel) (in office 1981–1982)
Rubén Darío Paredes (general) (in office 1982–1983)
Manuel Noriega (general) (in office 1983–1989)

North America
United States

South America
Argentina
José Félix Uriburu (lieutenant general) (in office 1930–1932)
Arturo Rawson (general) (in office 1943)
Pedro Pablo Ramírez (major general) (in office 1943–1944)
Edelmiro Julián Farrell (brigadier general) (in office 1944–1946)
Juan Domingo Perón (lieutenant general) (in office 1946–1955, 1973–1974)
Eduardo Lonardi (lieutenant general) (in office 1955)
Pedro Eugenio Aramburu (lieutenant general) (in office 1955–1958)
Juan Carlos Onganía (lieutenant general) (in office 1966–1970)
Roberto M. Levingston (brigadier general) (in office 1970–1971)
Alejandro Agustín Lanusse (lieutenant general) (in office 1971–1973)
Jorge Rafael Videla (lieutenant general) (in office 1976–1981)
Roberto Eduardo Viola (lieutenant general) (in office 1981)
Horacio Tomás Liendo (in office 1981)
Carlos Alberto Lacoste (navy vice-admiral ) (in office 1981)
Leopoldo Galtieri (lieutenant general) (in office 1981–1982)

Bolivia
Carlos Blanco Galindo (general) (in office 1930–1931)
David Toro (colonel) (in office 1936–1937)
Germán Busch (colonel) (in office 1937–1939)
Carlos Quintanilla (general) (in office 1939–1940)
Enrique Peñaranda (general) (in office 1940–1943)
Gualberto Villarroel (major) (in office 1943–1946)
Hugo Ballivián (general) (in office 1951–1952)
René Barrientos (general) (in office 1964–1965, 1966–1969)
Alfredo Ovando Candía (general) (in office 1965–1966, 1969–1970)
Juan José Torres (general) (in office 1970–1971)
Hugo Banzer (general) (in office 1971–1978)
David Padilla (general) (in office 1978–1979)
Luis García Meza Tejada (major general) (in office 1980–1981)
Celso Torrelio (major general) (in office 1981–1982)

Brazil
Deodoro da Fonseca (marshal) (in office 1889–1891)
Floriano Peixoto (marshal) (in office 1891–1894)
Hermes da Fonseca (marshal) (in office 1910–1914)
Getúlio Vargas (sergeant) (in office 1930–1945 and 1951–1954)
Eurico Gaspar Dutra (marshal) (in office 1946–1951)
Humberto de Alencar Castelo Branco (marshal) (in office 1964–1967)
Artur da Costa e Silva (marshal) (in office 1967–1969)
Emílio Garrastazu Médici (army general) (in office 1969–1974)
Ernesto Geisel (army general) (in office 1974–1979)
João Baptista de Oliveira Figueiredo (army general) (in office 1979–1985)
Itamar Franco (officer aspirant) (in office 1992–1995)
Jair Bolsonaro (captain) (in office 2019-2023)

Chile
Jorge Montt (vice admiral) (in office 1891–1896)
Luis Altamirano (major general) (in office 1924–1925)
Carlos Ibáñez del Campo (general) (in office 1927–1931)
Augusto Pinochet (captain general) (in office 1973–1990)

Colombia
Gustavo Rojas Pinilla (general) (in office 1953–1957)
Gabriel París Gordillo (major general) (in office 1957–1958)

Ecuador
Alberto Enríquez Gallo (general) (in office 1937–1938)
Ramón Castro Jijón (admiral) (in office 1963–1966)
Guillermo Rodríguez (general) (in office 1972–1976)
Alfredo Poveda (admiral) (in office 1976–1979)

Paraguay
Higinio Moríñigo (major general) (in office 1940–1948)
Alfredo Stroessner (major general) (in office 1954–1989)
Andrés Rodríguez (lieutenant general) (in office 1989–1993)

Peru
Antonio Gutiérrez de la Fuente (Peruvian military) (in office 1829)
Remigio Morales Bermúdez (colonel) (in office 1833–1834)
Felipe Santiago Salaverry (general) (in office 1835–1836)
Juan Crisóstomo Torrico (general) (in office 1842)
Juan Francisco de Vidal (general) (in office 1842–1843)
Manuel Ignacio de Vivanco (general) (in office 1843–1844)
Domingo Nieto (grand marshal) (in office 1843–1844)
Ramón Castilla (field marshal) (in office 1844, 1863)
Pedro Diez Canseco  (general) (in office 1862–1863)
Juan Antonio Pezet (general) (in office 1863–1865)
Tomás Gutiérrez (colonel) (in office 1872)
Miguel Iglesias (general) (in office 1881–1882)
Andrés Avelino Cáceres (general) (in office 1883–1885, 1886–1890, 1894–1895)
Pedro Pablo Bermúdez (marshal) (in office 1890–1894)
Óscar R. Benavides (brigadier general / major general) (in office 1914–1915, 1933–1939)
Luis Miguel Sánchez Cerro (brigadier general) (in office 1930–1933)
Manuel María Ponce Brousset (in office 1930)
Gustavo Jiménez (colonel) (in office 1931)
Manuel A. Odría (major general) (in office 1948–1956)
Zenón Noriega Agüero (major general) (in office 1950–1954)
Ricardo Pérez Godoy (general) (in office 1962–1963)
Nicolás Lindley López (general) (in office 1962–1963)
Juan Velasco Alvarado (major general) (in office 1968–1975)
Francisco Morales Bermúdez (general) (in office 1975–1980)

Suriname
Dési Bouterse (lieutenant colonel) (in office 1980–1988)

Uruguay
Gregorio Conrado Alvarez (major general) (in office 1981–1985)

Venezuela
José Antonio Páez (in office 1830–1835)
José María Carreño (in office July–August 1835)
Carlos Soublette (divisional general) (in office 1847–1851)
Julián Castro (in office 1858–1859)
Juan Crisóstomo Falcón (marshal) (in office 1863–1868)
Manuel Ezequiel Bruzual (in office April–June 1868)
José Ruperto Monagas (in office 1869–1870)
Antonio Guzmán Blanco (in office 1870–1877)
Francisco Linares Alcántara (in office 1877–1878)
José Gregorio Valera (general) (in office 1878–1879)
Joaquín Crespo (in office 1884–1886)
Hermógenes López (in office 1887–1888)
Ignacio Andrade (in office 1898–1899)
Juan Vicente Gómez (in office 1908–1913)
Eleazar López Contreras (brigadier general) (in office 1935–1941)
Isaías Medina Angarita (brigadier general) (in office 1941–1945)
Carlos Delgado Chalbaud (colonel) (in office 1948–1950)
Marcos Pérez Jiménez (major general) (in office 1950–1958)
Hugo Chávez (lieutenant colonel) (in office 1992–2013)

Asia
Bangladesh
Ziaur Rahman (lieutenant general) (in office 1976–1981)
Hussain Muhammad Ershad (lieutenant general) (in office 1982–1990)

Cambodia

 Lon Nol (marshal) (in office 1969–1975)
 Sisowath Sirik Matak (lieutenant general) (in office 1971–1972)
 Pol Pot (general) (in office 1976–1979)
 Pen Sovan (in office 1981)
 Chan Sy (in office 1982–1984)
 Hun Sen (in office 1985–present)

Indonesia

Suharto (general, later general of the army) (in office 1967–1998) 
Susilo Bambang Yudhoyono (general) (in office 2004–2014)

Iran
Reza Khan (brigadier→field marshal) (in office 1923–1925)
Haj Ali Razmara (general) (in office 1950–1951)
Hossein Ala' (colonel) (in office March – April 1951, 1955–1957)
Fazlollah Zahedi (major general) (in office 1953–1955)
Gholam Reza Azhari (major general) (in office 1978–1979)
Mohammad Khatami (second lieutenant) (in office 1997–2005)

Iraq
Abdul-Muhsin Al-Saadoun (second lieutenant) (in office 1922–1923, 1925–1926, 1928–1929, September – November 1929)
Jafar al-Askari (general) (in office 1923–1924, 1926–1928)
Yasin al-Hashimi (major general) (in office 1924–1925)
Nuri as-Said (in office 1930–1932)
Jamil al-Midfai (major general) (in office 1933–1934, 1935, 1937–1938, 1941, 1953)
Ali Jawdat al-Aiyubi (in office 1934–1935, 1949–1950) 
Abd al-Karim Qasim (general) (in office 1958–1963)
Taha al-Hashimi (in office 1941)
Nureddin Mahmud (in office 1952–1953)
Muhammad Najib ar-Ruba'i (in office 1958–1963)
Ahmed Hassan al-Bakr (general) (in office February – November 1963, 1968–1979)
Tahir Yahya (in office 1963–1965)
Abdul Salam Arif (field marshal) (in office 1963–1966)
Abd ar-Razzaq an-Naif (in office 1966)
Abdul Rahman Arif (general) (in office 1966–1968)
Naji Talib (in office 1966–1967)
Saddam Hussein (marshal) (in office 1979–1991, 1994–2005)

Japan
Hideki Tojo (general) (in office 1941–1944)
Kuniaki Koiso (general) (in office 1944–1945)

Lebanon
 Fuad Chehab (in office 1958–1964)
 Émile Lahoud (general) (in office 1998–2007)
 Michel Aoun (general) (in office 2016–present)

North Korea
Kim Il-sung (Wonsu, Taewonsu) (1948–1994)
Kim Jong-il (Wonsu) (1994–2011)
Kim Jong-un (Wonsu) (2011–present)

North Yemen
Ibrahim al-Hamadi (lieutenant colonel) (1974–1977)

Malaysia
 Hussein Onn (captain) (in office 1976–1981)

Myanmar
Ne Win (general) (in office 1958–1960, 1962–1981)
Sein Win (brigadier general) (in office 1974–1977)
Maung Kha (colonel) (in office 1977–1988)
San Yu (general) (in office 1981–1988)
Aye Ko (lieutenant general) (in office 12–19 August 1988)
Saw Maung (senior general) (in office 1988–1992)
Tun Tin (brigadier general) (in office July–September 1988)
Than Shwe (senior general) (in office 1992–2011)
Khin Nyunt (general) (in office 2003–2004)
Soe Win (general) (in office 2004–2007)
Thein Sein (general) (in office 2007–2016)

Pakistan
Ayub Khan (field marshal) (in office 1958–1969)
Yahya Khan (general) (in office 1969–1971)
Muhammad Zia-ul-Haq (general) (in office 1977–1988)
Pervez Musharraf (general) (in office 1999–2008)

Philippines
Emilio Aguinaldo (general) (in office 1899–1901)
Manuel L. Quezon (major) (in office 1935–1944)
Ferdinand Marcos (major) (in office 1965–1986)
Fidel V. Ramos (general) (in office 1992–1998)

Republic of China
Chiang Kai-shek (generalissimo) (in office 1928–1975)
Li Zongren (general) (in office 1949–1950)
Chen Cheng (general) (in office 1950–1954, 1958–1963)

Singapore
 Yusof bin Ishak (colonel) (in office 1965–1970)
 Lee Hsien Loong (brigadier general) (in office 2004–present)

South Korea
Lee Beom-seok (in office 1948–1950)
Jang Do-young (lieutenant general) (in office May–July 1961)
Song Yo Chan (lieutenant general) (in office 1961–1962)
Park Chung-hee (general) (in office 1962–1979)
Chung Il-kwon (general) (in office 1964–1970)
Kim Jong-pil (lieutenant general) (in office 1971–1975, 1998–2000)
Chun Doo-hwan (general) (in office 1980–1988)
Roh Tae-woo (general) (in office 1988–1993)
Park Tae-joon (general) (in office January–May 2000)

Sri Lanka
Gotabaya Rajapaksa (lieutenant colonel) (in office 2019-2022)

Syria
Fawzi Selu (general) (in office 1951–1953)
Adib Shishakli (general) (in office 1953–1954)
Amin al-Hafiz (general) (in office 1963–1966)
Hafez al-Assad (general) (in office 1970–2000)
Bashar al-Assad (marshal) (in office 2000–present)

Thailand
 Phraya Phahonphonphayuhasena (general) (in office 1933–1938)
 Plaek Pibulsonggram (field marshal) (in office 1938–1944, 1948–1957)
 Khuang Aphaiwong (field marshal) (in office 1944–1945, 1947–1948)
 Thawan Thamrongnawasawat (rear admiral) (in office 1946–1947)
 Thanom Kittikachorn (field marshal) (in office January – October 1958, 1963–1973)
 Sarit Dhanarajata (field marshal) (in office 1958–1963)
 Kukrit Pramoj (major general) (in office 1975–1976)
 Kriangsak Chamanan (general) (in office 1977–1980)
 Prem Tinsulanonda (general) (in office 1980–1988)
 Chatchai Choonhavan (general) (in office 1988–1991)
 Suchinda Kraprayoon (general) (in office April–May 1992)
 Chavalit Yongchaiyudh (general) (in office 1996–1997)
 Surayud Chulanont (general) (in office 2006–2008)
 Prayut Chan-o-cha (general) (in office 2014–present)

Turkey
 Mustafa Kemal Atatürk (marshal) (in office 1923–1938)
 Fethi Okyar (lieutenant colonel) (in office 1923, 1924–1925)
 İsmet İnönü (orgeneral) (in office 1938–1950)
 Cemal Gürsel (general) (in office 1960–1966)
 Fahrettin Özdilek (general) (in office October–November 1961)
 Bülent Ulusu (admiral) (in office 1980–1983)
 Kenan Evren (general) (in office 1980–1989)

Vietnam
 Lê Đức Anh (general) (in office 1992–1997)
 Nguyễn Tấn Dũng (major) (in office 2006–2016)
 Trần Đại Quang (general) (in office 2016–2018)

South Vietnam
Nguyễn Văn Xuân (brigadier general) (in office 1947–1949)
Duong Van Minh (general) (in office 1963 – January 1964, February – October 1964)
Nguyen Khanh (general) (in office January – August, September – November 1964)
Nguyen Cao Ky (air vice marshal) (in office 1965–1967)
Nguyễn Văn Lộc (in office 1967–1968)
Trần Thiện Khiêm (general) (in office 1969–1975)
Nguyen Van Thieu (lieutenant general) (in office 1965–1975)

Europe
Albania
 Essad Pasha Toptani (Ottoman Army) (in office 1914–1916)
 Qazim Koculi (first lieutenant) (in office 7–8 December 1921)
 Francesco Jacomoni (lieutenant-general) (in office 1939–1943)
 Alberto Pariani (general) (in office March–September 1943)
 Fiqri Dine (colonel) (in office July–August 1944)
 Enver Hoxha (general) (in office 1944–1954)
 Mehmet Shehu (in office 1954–1981)
Bulgaria
Kimon Georgiev (colonel general) (in office 1934–1935, 1944–1946)
Commonwealth of England, Scotland and Ireland (now UK and RoI) 
Oliver Cromwell (captain general) (in office 1653–1658)
Croatia
Franjo Tuđman (Vrhovnik/marshal) (in office 1990–1999)

Czechoslovakia
 Jan Syrový (general) (in office September–December 1938)
Ludvík Svoboda (general) (in office 1968–1975)

Finland
Gustaf Mannerheim (general / field marshal) (in office 1918–1919, 1944–1946)
France
Maximilien de Béthune, Duke of Sully (marshal) (in office 1589–1611)
Louis Jules Trochu (general) (in office 1870–1871)
Ernest Courtot de Cissey (general) (in office 1874–1875)
Patrice de Mac-Mahon, duc de Magenta (marshal of France) (in office 1873–1879)
Philippe Pétain (marshal of France) (in office 1940–1944)
François Darlan (admiral) (in office 1941–1942)
Charles de Gaulle (brigadier general) (in office 1944–1946, 1959–1969)
Germany
 Otto von Bismarck (colonel general) (in office 1871–1890)
 Leo von Caprivi (general) (in office 1890–1894)
 Prince Maximilian of Baden (major general) (in office 3 October9 November 1918)
 Paul von Hindenburg (general field marshal) (in office 1925–1934)
 Karl Dönitz (grand admiral) (in office April–May 1945)
Greece
Petrobey Mavromichalis (in office 1823–1824)
Theodoros Kolokotronis (lieutenant general) (in office 28 March14 April 1832)
Augustinos Kapodistrias (in office 1831–1832)
Dimitrios Plapoutas (general) (in office 1832–1833)
Demetrios Ypsilantis (general) (in office 1832–1833)
Konstantinos Kanaris (admiral) (in office February–March 1844, 1848–1849, March–April 1864, 1864–1865)
Kitsos Tzavelas (in office 1847–1848)
Gennaios Kolokotronis (general) (in office May–October 1862)
Antonios Kriezis (captain) (in office 1857–1862, 1849–1854)
Athanasios Miaoulis (admiral) (in office 1857–1862)
Gennaios Kolokotronis (general) (in office May–October 1862)
Pavlos Kountouriotis (admiral) (in office October–November 1920, 1924–1926, 1926–1929)
Anastasios Charalambis (lieutenant general) (in office 29–30 September 1922)
Stylianos Gonatas (colonel) (in office 1922–1924)
Theodoros Pangalos (lieutenant general) (in office July–October 1926)
Georgios Kondylis (major general) (in office August–December 1926, October–November 1935)
Alexandros Othonaios (lieutenant general) (in office 6–10 March 1933)
Ioannis Metaxas (lieutenant general) (in office 1936–1941)
Georgios Tsolakoglou (lieutenant general) (in office 1941–1942)
Evripidis Bakirtzis (in office March–April 1944)
Nikolaos Plastiras (lieutenant general) (in office August–October 1945, April–August 1950, 1951–1952)
Petros Voulgaris (vice admiral) (in office April–October 1945)
Markos Vafiadis (general) (in office 1947–1949)
Alexandros Papagos (field marshal) (in office 1952–1955)
Georgios Zoitakis (lieutenant general, later full general) (in office 1967–1972)
Georgios Papadopoulos (colonel) (in office 1967–1973)
Phaedon Gizikis (general) (in office 1973–1974)
Hungary
Artúr Görgei (major general) (in office 11–13 August 1849)
Archduke Joseph August (field marshal) (in office July–August 1919)
Miklós Horthy (vice-admiral) (in office 1920–1944)
Döme Sztójay (colonel general) (in office March–August 1944)
Géza Lakatos (colonel general) (in office August–October 1944)
Ferenc Szálasi (major) (in office 1944–1945)
Béla Miklós (colonel general) (in office February–November 1945)
Mátyás Rákosi (Austro-Hungarian Army) (in office 1948–1956)
Montenegro
Janko Vukotić (general) (in office 1913–1915)
Italy
 Ettore Perrone di San Martino (general) (in office October–December 1848)
 Agostino Chiodo (general) (in office February–March 1849)
 Claudio Gabriele de Launay (general) (in office March–May 1849)
 Alfonso Ferrero La Marmora (general) (in office 1859–1860, 1864–1866)
 Francesco Crispi (inspector general) (in office 1887–1991, 1893–1896)
 Luigi Pelloux (general) (in office 1898–1900)
 Benito Mussolini (first marshal of the Empire) (in office 1922–1943)
 Pietro Badoglio (marshal) (in office 1943–1944)
Poland
Józef Piłsudski (marshal of Poland) (in office 1918–1922, de facto leader 1926–1935)
Władysław Sikorski (major general) (in office 1922–1923)
Felicjan Sławoj Składkowski (major general) (in office 1936–1939)
Wojciech Jaruzelski (general) (in office 1981–1990)
Portugal
João do Canto e Castro (admiral) (in office 1918–1919)
Óscar Carmona (marshal) (in office 1926–1951)
José Mendes Cabeçadas (admiral) (in office 1926)
Manuel de Oliveira Gomes da Costa (admiral, general) (in office 1926)
Francisco Craveiro Lopes (general) (in office 1951–1958)
Américo Tomás (rear admiral) (in office 1958–1974)
António de Spínola (general) (in office April–September 1974)
Francisco da Costa Gomes (general) (in office 1974–1976)
António Ramalho Eanes (general) (in office 1976–1985)
Romania
Ion Antonescu (marshal of Romania) (in office 1940–1944)
Nicolae Rădescu (lieutenant general (in office 1944–1945)
Spain
Miguel Ricardo de Álava y Esquivel (brigadier general) (in office 14–25 September 1835)
Isidro de Alaix Fábregas (general) (in office 1838–1839)
Valentín Ferraz y Barrau (lieutenant general) (in office 12–28 August 1840)
Vicente Sancho y Cobertores (general) (in office 11–16 September 1840)
Baldomero Espartero, Prince of Vergara (general) (in office 1840–1843)
José Ramón Rodil, 1st Marquis of Rodil (general) (in office July – August 1840, 1841–1842)
Salustiano de Olózaga y Almandoz  (in office 28 November – 5 December 1843)
Luis González-Bravo y López de Arjona  (in office 1843–1844)
Serafín María de Sotto, 3rd Count of Clonard (in office 19 – 20 October 1849)
Joaquín María de Ferrer y Cafranga (general) (in office 10–20 May 1853)
Federico de Roncali, 1st Count of Alcoy (general) (in office 1852–1853)
Francisco de Lersundi y Hormaechea (general) (in office April–September 1853)
Leopoldo O'Donnell, 1st Duke of Tetuan (general) (in office July–October 1856)
Francisco Armero y Peñaranda, 1st Marquis of Nervión (general) (in office 1857–1858)
Fernando Fernández de Córdova (general) (in office 17–18 July 1864)
Leopoldo O'Donnell y Jorris (general) (in office 1865–1866)
Ramón María Narváez, 1st Duke of Valencia (general) (in office 1864–1865, 1866–1868)
José Gutiérrez de la Concha, 1st Marquis of Havana (general) (in office 19–30 September 1868)
Juan Prim, 1st Marquis of Los Castillejos (general) (in office 1869–1870)
José Malcampo y Monge, 3rd Marquis of San Rafael (admiral) (in office October–December 1871)
Juan Bautista Topete y Carballo (admiral) (in office May–June 1872)
Fernando Fernández de Córdova, 2nd Marquis of Mendigorría  (in office 13–16 June 1872)
Francisco Serrano, 1st Duke of la Torre (marshal) (in office January–February 1874)
Juan de Zavala, 1st Marquis of Sierra Bullones (general) (in office February–December 1874)
Joaquín Jovellar  (general) (in office September–December 1875)
Arsenio Martínez-Campos y Antón (general) (in office March–December 1879)
Marcelo Azcárraga Palmero (in office August–October 1897)
José López Domínguez (general) (in office July–December 1906)
Miguel Primo de Rivera (captain general) (in office 1923–1930)
Dámaso Berenguer (general) (in office 1930–1931)
Juan Bautista Aznar-Cabañas (general) (in office February–April 1931)
Miguel Cabanellas (general) (in office July–October 1936)
Fidel Dávila Arrondo (general) (in office 1936–1937)
Francisco Gómez-Jordana (general) (in office 1937–1938)
José Miaja (general) (in office 13–28 March 1939)
Francisco Franco (generalissimo) (in office 1939–1975)
Emilio Herrera Linares (general) (in office 1960–1962)
Luis Carrero Blanco (admiral) (in office June–December 1973)
Fernando de Santiago y Díaz (general) (in office 2–5 July 1976)
Socialist Federal Republic of Yugoslavia
Josip Broz Tito (marshal of Yugoslavia) (in office 1945–1980)
Soviet Union / Russia
Joseph Stalin (generalissimus of the Soviet Union) (in office 1922–1953)
Kliment Voroshilov (marshal of the Soviet Union) (in office 1953–1960)

Lists of office-holders
Lists of politicians
Lists of military personnel